Pushing Dead is a 2016 American dramatic-comedy film written and directed by Tom E. Brown and starring James Roday Rodriguez, Danny Glover, Robin Weigert and Khandi Alexander. The film follows a struggling writer, HIV positive for 20+ years, who deposits a $100 birthday check and is dropped from his health plan for earning too much.

Plot

Cast
 James Roday Rodriguez as Dan Schauble
 Danny Glover as Bob
 Robin Weigert as Paula
 Khandi Alexander as Dot
 Tom Riley as Mike

Release
The film premiered at the Frameline Film Festival on June 18, 2016.

References

External links
 
 

American comedy-drama films
2016 comedy-drama films
2010s English-language films
2010s American films